CDSP may refer to:

 China Democratic Socialist Party, a former political party in China
 Church Divinity School of the Pacific, a seminary in the United States